Kornél Mundruczó (born 3 April 1975) is a Hungarian film and theatre director. He has directed 18 short and feature films between 1998 and 2020. His film Johanna was screened in the Un Certain Regard section of the 2005 Cannes Film Festival. The production of White God, another of his full-length films, was supported by the Hungarian Film Fund. It won the Prize Un Certain Regard at the 2014 Cannes Film Festival and was screened in the Spotlight section of Sundance Film Festival in 2015.

Early life 
Mundruczó earned a diploma from Hungary's Academy of Film and Drama in 1998 as an actor, then in 2003 as a film and television director. In that same year, he founded Proton Cinema Ltd., dedicated to film production, along with Viktória Petrányi, a constant co-creator and collaborator in his work and writing since the academy.

Career

Film
Mundruczó's first full-length feature This I wish and nothing more won, among other prizes, the award for best first film at the 31st Hungarian Film Week, as well as its Students’ Jury and Directors’ Guild Awards. He directed his short film Afta shortly after leaving school. It went on to win numerous international awards. Pleasant Days, his second feature film, was awarded the Silver Leopard in Locarno in 2002. In 2003, he won the Cinéfondation Program's artistic grant, within the framework of the Cannes International Film Festival, where he developed the screenplay of the film Delta, together with Yvette Bíró in Paris.

He has been a member of the European Film Academy since 2004. In 2005, he won the Nipkow Program's artistic grant to participate for three months in courses and consultations for talented screenwriters and directors in Berlin. His fourth, fifth, and seventh feature-length films were entered in the official competition of Cannes Film Festival: Delta in 2008, Tender Son in 2010 and Jupiter's Moon in 2017. The first won the FIPRESCI Award.

In 2014, his film, White God – which was invited to Cannes Film Festival and made with the support of Eurimages, the European Council’s film foundation and the Hungarian National Film Foundation – won the main prize of the Un Certain Regard program at the 67th Cannes Film Festival. Also, the film’s canine star won the Palm Dog Award for best performance by a dog. His first English-language feature, Pieces of a Woman, was in Competition at 77th Venice International Film Festival.

In 2021, his film Evolution premiered in the new section of 2021 Cannes Film Festival, called Cannes Premiere, designed to give returning Cannes auteurs a safe place to screen new work outside of the competition.

Theatre
Mundruczó has worked in theatre and opera since 2003, first in Hungary and then in theatres abroad such as the Thalia Theater in Hamburg, the TR Warszawa, the Schauspielhaus Zürich and the Vlaamse Opera. He is most keen to begin new projects where he finds the subject, collaborators and venue inspiring. During the creative process, he strives to create a team. For new projects, he very often casts the same actors, who work with him as creative partners. After freelancing with more or less the same group of people for several years, in 2009, he founded Proton Theatre, his independent theatre company, with producer Dóra Büki.

Proton Theatre is a virtual artistic company organised around the director’s independent productions. Besides preserving maximum artistic freedom, their goal is to ensure a professional structure for their independently produced theatre plays and projects. Chiefly, their performances are realized as international co-productions, and their frequent collaborators include the Wiener Festwochen, HAU Hebbel am Ufer in Berlin, Kunstenfestivaldesarts in Brussels, Trafó House of Contemporary Arts in Budapest and Hellerau in Dresden. Productions directed by the artistic leader include The Ice (2006); Frankenstein-project (2007), which inspired his later film Tender Son; Hard to be a God (2010); Disgrace (2012), based on the post-apartheid novel by Nobel Prize-winner J. M. Coetzee and, in turn, inspiring his film White God; Dementia (2014), Winterreise (2015), Imitation of Life (2016), The Raft of the Medusa (2018), Evolution (2019) inspiring his film with the same title and The Seven Deadly Sins/Motherland (2020). In addition, Proton wishes to provide space for the realisation of company members’ ideas. In this spirit, they created the following performances: Last (2014), directed by Roland Rába; 1 link (2015), directed by Gergely Bánki and Finding Quincy by János Szemenyei.

Proton's performances have toured to more than 110 festivals until 2020, including the Festival d’Avignon, the Adelaide Festival, the Singapore International Festival, the Seoul Bo:m Festival, and the Zürcher Theater Spektakel. In 2017, for Imitation of life, Mundruczó was nominated for the Faust Award. It was the first time in the history of this award that a non-German theatre, in this case a Hungarian independent company was nominated.

Filmography

Theatre

Opera

References

External links
 Proton Theatre
 
 

1975 births
Living people
Hungarian male film actors
Hungarian film directors
Hungarian screenwriters
Male screenwriters
Hungarian male writers
People from Gödöllő